Akhalkalaki (Akhalkalakis munitsip’alit’et’i) is a municipality in southern Georgia, in the region of Samtskhe-Javakheti with a population of 41,026 (2021).

Administrative divisions
Akhalkalaki municipality is administratively divided into one city (the municipal centre Akhalkalaki) and 21 communities (თემი, temi) with 64 villages (სოფელი, sopeli).

Politics
Akhalkalaki Municipal Assembly (Georgian: ახალქალაქის საკრებულო, Akhalkalaki Sakrebulo) is the representative body in Akhalkalaki Municipality, consisting of 42 members which are elected every four years. The last election was held in October 2021. Melqon Makarian of Georgian Dream was elected mayor.

Population 

By the start of 2021 the population was determined at 41,026 people, a decrease of 9% compared to the 2014 census. The population of the city of Akhalkalaki decreased with 6% during the same period.

The vast majority (93%) of the population of Akhalkalaki are Armenians, which makes Akhalkalaki the 2nd most Armenian populated Georgian municipality, after its neighbour Nonotsminda. The remaining 7% are nearly exclusively Georgians. There are a few dozen Russians and Greeks. In terms of religion, 79% of the population consists of followers of the Armenian Apostolic Church, followed by Catholics (12%) and Georgian Orthodox Church (6%). Furthermore, there are small numbers of Jehovah's Witnesses, Protestants and Jews.

See also 
 List of municipalities in Georgia (country)

External links 

 Website Akhalkalaki Municipality

References

Municipalities of Samtskhe–Javakheti